Madrid, 1987 is a 2011 Spanish drama film written and directed by David Trueba.  It stars José Sacristán as an old, bitter journalist who attempts to seduce a young journalism student played by María Valverde.  It premiered at the 2011 San Sebastián International Film Festival.

Plot 
In 1987, Miguel, an old and bitter journalist, agrees to meet with Ángela, an idealistic young journalism student, for an interview at a local restaurant.  Ángela has missed many of her lectures and needs to write an essay; she has chosen to use Miguel as her subject.  Throughout the interview, Miguel expresses his contempt for idealism and style.  When he reads a sample of Ángela's writing, Miguel dismisses much of it, though he says that she is talented.  He asks to keep the sample and invites Ángela to his friend Luis' house.  Miguel explains that Luis will be gone until Monday, and they will have the place to themselves.  She agrees, and they continue their discussions there over whiskey.  Miguel walks over Luis' paintings, and, when Ángela objects, he says that Luis would prefer them to be marred by life and experience.  Miguel alternates between cynical advice and derisively ridiculing romantic notions of journalism. Miguel says there are too many layers of glasses between them, he takes off Ángela's eyeglasses and kisses her. She accepted the kiss reluctantly and had an annoyed expression on her face.  Soon, he enters the bedroom and point blank asks Ángela to strip naked.  When she balks, he tells her that he has been true to his nature and never hidden his motives.  When she turns to leave, Miguel stops her and says that he hopes she will one day respect him for his boldness.

As Miguel smokes a cigarette, he hears the boards creaking, and Ángela steps through the doorway wearing nothing but an open shirt.  Surprised, Miguel wordlessly spreads paint over her naked body.  Ángela rises to wash it off, and he follows her to the bathroom.  After they take turns in the shower, Ángela becomes frustrated when she cannot open the door.  Miguel tries as well and concludes that it has locked from the outside.  The bathroom has only one towel, and both are naked; when he realizes her discomfort, Miguel surrenders the towel to Ángela.  The two continue their conversation from before, and Miguel alternates between attempts to seduce Ángela, giving cynical advice, and expressing his preference for whiskey and cigarettes over company with her.  As time passes, the two become worried that they will be missed: Miguel by his wife, and Ángela by her parents.  When Miguel learns that Ángela is the daughter of a prominent fascist soldier, he describes his run-ins with fascists and failed attempts to seduce Ángela's eldest sister.  Although initially opposed to bringing in outside intervention, Miguel agrees that the risk of scandal is now outweighed by their desire to leave the bathroom.  However, their cries out the window go apparently unheard. When Ángela tried to stand on a chair to call for help through the vent window, Miguel took advantage of this to feel her butch and kiss on her back. At first, Ángela showed no objection, but when Miguel reached up to touch her private part, she pushed his hand down and said enough was enough. Miguel continues to seduce Ángela for sex with him, but she firmly refuses.  She switched from holding the towel in front of her chest to wrapping it around her waist to show her self-protection from Miguel's sexual abuse.  Miguel begins to talk about literature, his family, and his relationship with his wife.  This attracted Ángela and allowed him to get close to her. Miguel once again tried to kiss Ángela and this time she accepted the kiss.  They had a deep kiss before Miguel suddenly got bored and stopped the kiss leaving Ángela looking confused.

As Miguel sat on the edge of the tub and becomes despondent about the situation, his age, his attractiveness, and his foolish desire to seduce to a much younger woman, Ángela turned off the light, walked over to Miguel, took off her towel, sat on his lap, facing him, took off his glasses and dropped them into the tub.  After a moment of hesitation, Ángela reached for Miguel's shoulder while he hugged her and her body began to move indicating that the two of them were having sex.  Their naked bodies pressed against each other and Ángela appeared completely willing to have sex with Miguel.  When the sexual process reached its climax, she untied her hair tie to show assertiveness in her decision.  Her toes gripped the tub's wall and her moans grew louder.  One of her hands clutched the bath curtain while the other wrapped around Miguel's neck.  When Miguel started moaning indicating that he was about to orgasm, Ángela hurriedly asked him not to come inside her.  Even so, she orgasms at the same time as him, causing her efforts to fail in stopping Miguel from come inside her.  He hugged her tightly and kissed on her breasts while they both orgasmed.  Ángela and Miguel both looked exhausted after sex, she rested her head on his shoulder, pressing her bare breasts against his chest while her legs slid resignedly down the side of the tub.

After the lovemaking, the two relax in the bath and express their orgasmic satisfaction.  The way they talked became more intimate and open.  Afterward, Miguel dismisses her feelings of guilt and proclaims himself to have a more developed and profound sense of guilt.  Ángela angrily accuses him of egotism, which she says she will write about in her essay. Ángela asks Miguel what he considers her after the two have sex, a curious or a naughty girl. The two become tense when Miguel replies to Ángela that she's naughty, but she thinks it's advanced. They quickly reconcile when a chastened Miguel offers to entertain Ángela with a story.  The story, framed as an imaginary film that they are watching at the cinema, is about a boy who refuses to leave his bed under any circumstances.  The boy insists that nothing is wrong with him; he simply desires not to leave his bed.  When the boy mysteriously disappears, his parents are conflicted as to whether they should be glad he has left his bed or sad that he has run away.

Before Miguel can end the story, Luis returns to rescue them, summoned by a worker who heard their earlier calls for help.  Ángela quickly dressed and left.  As she passed Miguel, she looked at him hesitantly for a moment before walking out of the apartment and slamming the door.  Forgot her glasses on the crayons table.  Luis asks Miguel if he will see Ángela again, but Miguel is philosophical.  He tells Luis to keep a pair of glasses that Ángela left behind and reasons that if she returns, it will be to Luis' house.  The film ends as Ángela walks back to her parents' house.

Cast 
 José Sacristán as Miguel
 María Valverde as Ángela
 Ramon Fontserè as Luis

Production 
The film was shot in twelve days in Madrid.  The inspiration for the film came from writer-director David Trueba's experiences as a young journalist in Spain in the 1980s.

Release 
Madrid, 1987 premiered 22 September 2011 at the San Sebastián International Film Festival.  The international premiere was at the 2011 Sundance Film Festival.  Breaking Glass Pictures released it on home video on 26 February 2013.

Reception 
Rotten Tomatoes, a review aggregator, reports that 86% of seven surveyed critics gave the film a positive review; the average rating was 6.6/10.  Metacritic rated it 61/100 based on seven reviews.  Rene Rodriguez of the Miami Herald rated it 3.5/4 stars and called it "an engrossing study of generational clash inside a locked bathroom."  Jonathan Holland of Variety called it a "perceptive" and "ultra-wordy" film that will mostly appeal to Spanish art-house audiences.  Sheri Linden of the Los Angeles Times wrote, "The actors give their characters a resonance beyond the symbolic, but the action doesn't quite transcend the stagy setup."  John DeFore of The Hollywood Reporter wrote, "An engrossing two-hander combining the smart-talk microcosm of My Dinner With Andre and the sexual dynamics of a Philip Roth novel, David Trueba's Madrid, 1987 is more universal than its title suggests and holds a strong art house appeal."  Jon Caramanica of The New York Times called it a "sweet, sometimes dull and certainly overlong film".  Fionnuala Halligan of Screen Daily wrote, "It is, in fact, hard to think of a movie less cinematic than Madrid, 1987" and stated that it might make a better play than film.  Ollie Coen of DVD Talk rated it 3/5 stars and wrote, "For an artsy movie about two people stuck naked in a bathroom together, you could do much worse. [...] It has a lot to say about youth, love, idealism, sex, and life in general."

The film received a lot of controversy about how it exploited the sexual aspect and nudity scenes most of the film to convey content.  The line between porn and art.  The sex scene between the two main characters is considered too realistic and controversial.  Some doubted the movie's sex scene was real when the female protagonist asked the male lead not come inside her, although this was denied by the producer.  The age difference of the two main actors also creates mixed opinions when the male lead is 74 years old and the female lead is 24 years old.

References

External links 
 
 
 

2011 films
2011 drama films
Spanish drama films
Spanish independent films
Films about journalists
Films directed by David Trueba
Films set in 1987
Films set in Madrid
Films shot in Madrid
2011 independent films
2010s Spanish films